Maseng is a surname. Notable people with the surname include:

Alfred Maseng (d. 2004), Vanatuan politician
Danny Maseng, Israeli singer-songwriter
Einar Maseng (1880–1972), Norwegian diplomat
Mari Maseng Will (born 1954), American political advisor
Ragnvald Maseng (1891–1920), Norwegian sport shooter
Sigurd Maseng (1894-1952), Norwegian diplomat
Torleiv Maseng (born 1946), Norwegian engineer